Zororo Makamba (17 January 1990 – 23 March 2020) was a Zimbabwean journalist and the son of Irene and James Makamba.

Biography
Makamba posted commentary on Zimbabwean politics and society online under the heading "State of the Nation", and hosted current affairs programs on ZiFM Stereo and M-Net television affiliate Zambezi Magic.

He had myasthenia gravis, a neuroskeletomuscular autoimmune disease, and underwent surgery to remove a thymoma gland tumour in November 2019. He was diagnosed on 21 March 2020 with COVID-19, twelve days after returning from New York City and five days after going to a doctor with a cough and fever. He died in Harare two days later, the first death in the country due to the disease.

See also
 COVID-19 pandemic in Zimbabwe

References

1990 births
2020 deaths
Zimbabwean journalists
Place of birth missing
Deaths from the COVID-19 pandemic in Zimbabwe
21st-century journalists
Impact of the COVID-19 pandemic on journalism
Male journalists